The Migrants and Ethnic-minorities for Reproductive Justice (MERJ) is an Irish advocacy group for reproductive rights for migrants, Travellers and people of colour in Ireland.

History
Migrants and Ethnic-minorities for Reproductive Justice (MERJ) was founded in 2017 as a voice for migrants, Travellers and people of colour affected by the restrictive access to abortion in Ireland as part of the wider Repeal the 8th campaign. In particular, some migrants in Ireland could not travel for abortion services in the United Kingdom or Europe before the Eighth Amendment was repealed.

Core activities
MERJ campaign highlighting how migrant women, women of colour and from ethnic minorities are disproportionately affected by issues relating to maternal health, with 40% of maternal deaths in Ireland being migrant women in 2015. Since the repeal of the Eighth Amendment in 2018, MERJ now focus on how the current legislation on abortion services in Ireland continue to affect migrants and asylum seekers as well as campaigning against racism and Direct Provision. MERJ is organising events on and opening up conversations about abolitionist feminism and challenging white feminism in Ireland and beyond.

In June 2020, MERJ with Black Pride Ireland and Movement of Asylum Seekers in Ireland, were involved in organising Black Lives Matter protests and demonstrations in response to the murder of George Floyd.

References 

Non-profit organisations based in the Republic of Ireland
Organizations established in 2017
Abortion-rights organisations in Ireland